Franklin Rule Shamel (December 6, 1912 – November 2, 1994) was an American professional basketball player. He appeared in three games for the Cincinnati Comellos in the National Basketball League during the 1937–38 season and averaged 3.3 points per game.

References

1912 births
1994 deaths
American men's basketball players
Basketball players from Indiana
Cincinnati Comellos players
Earlham Quakers men's basketball players
Forwards (basketball)
People from Greencastle, Indiana